JoBe Cerny (born December 5, 1947), sometimes credited as Jo Be Cerny, is an American actor. He is best known as the current voice of the Pillsbury Doughboy, succeeding Paul Frees and Jeff Bergman, and as Procter & Gamble's silent spokesman, The Cheer Man.

Career
In addition to appearing in advertising spots and commercials, Cerny has appeared in numerous films, including Legally Blonde 2 (2003), Road to Perdition (2002), and My Best Friend's Wedding (1997). Cerny has also been featured in televised series and talk shows including Chicago Hope and Oprah, as well as appearing in numerous theatrical performances.

Currently, Cerny is the founder and president of Cerny/American Creative, a Chicago-based production company which offers creative services catering to film companies and advertising agencies, a weekly column writer for Screen Magazine and a recipient of The American Scene Award.
  
Cerny received his bachelor's degree in Speech & Drama at Valparaiso University and his master's degree in Theater at Northwestern University.

Filmography

References

External links

Chicago Reader article on JoBe Cerny

1947 births
American male film actors
American male voice actors
Northwestern University School of Communication alumni
People from Cicero, Illinois
Valparaiso University alumni
Living people